Jeremiah Reeves (1935 – March 28, 1958) was a 22-year-old African American, a former jazz drummer, who was unjustly executed by the state of Alabama by electrocution after being convicted of raping a white woman in 1952. At the time of the events, Reeves was 16 years old, working as a grocery delivery boy; at his trial, he denied having had sex with the white woman. His sentence and execution were considered unjust, outsize for the crime, and a large protest had formed by the time he was executed, after appeals.

Background
Jeremiah Reeves was a 16-year-old respected senior in the segregated high school, a talented jazz drummer in a band. He was also working as a grocery delivery boy in Montgomery, Alabama when he was indicted in 1952 for the rape of a white woman. He was indicted, then quickly convicted at a two-day trial by an all-white jury that deliberated less than a half-hour; the judge imposed a death sentence. Members of the African-American community were outraged at the sentence, as they knew that not only were white men seldom prosecuted for rape of black women, but they never received the death sentence for such crimes.

According to the memoir by Rev. Martin Luther King Jr., he spent much time on the Reeves case. Black people were outraged by the injustice of the sentence in the case. Reeves retracted his confession, which was derived under duress. After his arrest, police strapped the terrified 16 year old Reeves to an electric chair and threatened to electrocute him unless he confessed to raping Mabel Ann Crowder as well as the reported rapes of white women that had occurred that summer. He denied for the rest of his life having had any relations with the white woman.

Reeves' legal appeal of his conviction and death sentence by an Alabama State Criminal Court reached the Federal Circuit Court. One of the grounds by the defense was that the jury excluded African Americans. His case twice reached the United States Supreme Court, with the high court ordering a new trial on December 6, 1954  <ref>"Jeremiah Reeves Wins His Appeal To Supreme Court", Montgomery (AL) Advertiser, December 7, 1954, p.1</ref> and voting not to review an appeal on January 13, 1958, following Reeves' conviction on retrial.    As King wrote in his memoir:
"The first time, the Court reversed the decision and turned it back to the state supreme court for rehearing. The second time, the United States Supreme Court agreed to hear the case but later dismissed it, thus leaving the Alabama court free to electrocute." The governor failed to commute his sentence.

Claudette Colvin was a younger classmate of Reeves and among those very upset about his case during the years that appeals were underway. On March 2, 1955, she defied Montgomery's bus segregation rules, which required blacks to give up seats to whites in the middle of the bus once the first rows were filled. Her action took place 9 months before Rosa Parks exercised her right of refusal and became the point person on a civil rights challenge case in which blacks conducted the more than yearlong Montgomery bus boycott to protest the segregated system. Colvin was one of four women named in the case ultimately taken to the courts, which achieved the end of bus segregation on city buses.

Reeves had claimed during his trial and appeals that he was forced to sit in the Alabama electric chair, known as Yellow Mama, for a night until he confessed to the crime. The State held Reeves on death row after his conviction until after he reached the age of 21, considered the minimum age for execution. He was put to death on March 28, 1958, in the same chair used to extract his confession years before. Considered a victim of racism and injustice, Reeves attracted sympathy from his arrest.

The National Association for the Advancement of Colored People (NAACP) provided funds to pay for his defense in an effort to protect the youth. Protests had arisen about his sentence, and followed his execution. Days after his execution, on Easter morning leaders of the national protest, including Rev. Martin Luther King Jr., led a prayer pilgrimage to the grounds of the Alabama state capitol in Montgomery.

On that occasion, King said, 

References

 Statement delivered at the Prayer Pilgrimage Protesting the Electrocution of Jeremiah Reeves 
 "Jeremiah Reeves", Inmates Executed in Alabama

External links
 Treading the Tightrope of Jim Crow; Montgomery NAACP. The Rebellious Life of Mrs. Rosa Parks.''

1958 deaths
People executed by Alabama by electric chair
20th-century executions of American people
People executed for rape
Executed African-American people
American people convicted of rape
1935 births
20th-century African-American people